Joe Mantegna portrayed Robert B. Parker's  detective "Spenser" in three TV films on the A&E cable network between 1999 and 2001.

Production
Robert B. Parker had a significant role in the development of the TV movies (all three films were adapted by Parker, with his wife co-authoring Walking Shadow) as opposed to the earlier Spenser: For Hire. Nonetheless, he felt that the movies didn't get it right, not because of the performances but because of the limited budget. Parker had a small role in the first film, and cameos in the later two. His son, Daniel, and wife, Joan, appear in Thin Air. Spenser's ally, Hawk, was played by Sheik Mahmud-Bey in "Small Vices", and returns in "Walking Shadow" portrayed by Ernie Hudson.

All three movies were filmed in locations in Canada.

Films

Spenser: Small Vices  
In this movie Spenser tries to solve the murder of a college student. 
It was broadcast in 1999, and is based on the 1997 novel of the same name.
 Joe Mantegna as Spenser
 Marcia Gay Harden as Susan Silverman
 Joanna Miles as Evans
 R.D. Reid as Quirk
 Scott Wickware as Captain Healy
 Sheik Mahmud-Bey as Hawk
 Robert B. Parker as Ives

Thin Air 
In this movie, Spenser searches for the wife of his longtime associate, Sgt. Belson.
It was broadcast in 2000, and is based on the 1995 novel of the same name.
 Joe Mantegna as Spenser
 Marcia Gay Harden as Susan Silverman
 Joanna Miles as Evans
 R.D. Reid as Quirk
 Jon Seda as Luis DeLeon
 David Ferry as Frank Belson

Walking Shadow  
In this movie, Spenser tries to solve the on-stage murder of an actor.
It was broadcast in 2001, and is based on the 1994 novel of the same name.
It is directed by Po-Chih Leong. 
 Joe Mantegna as Spenser
 Marcia Gay Harden as Susan Silverman
 Scott Wickware as Captain Healy
 Ernie Hudson as Hawk
 Eric Roberts as Police Chief DeSpain
 Christopher Lawford as Jimmy Christopholous
 Tamlyn Tomita as Rikki Wu

Audiobooks
Joe Mantegna has also narrated a number of Spenser novels;

References

External links
 
 
 
 Small Vices at the Internet Archive

1999 American television series debuts
1990s American crime drama television series
2000s American crime drama television series
American mystery television series
Television shows set in Boston
Television shows based on American novels
A&E (TV network) original films